Maria Fernanda Torres (born August 26, 1994) is a Puerto Rican professional golfer. She became the first player from Puerto Rico to earn full LPGA Tour membership in 2017.

Amateur career
Torres represented Puerto Rico at the Espirito Santo Trophy in 2014 and 2016, and at the Pan American Games in 2015. She won the Caribbean Amateur Championship in 2012, 2014 and 2017.

She graduated from the University of Florida in 2017 with a degree in Family, Youth and Community Science. She had five wins while playing for Florida Gators women's golf, and set the school record for lowest single-season scoring average (71.71 in 2017). She won the SEC Championship and was named SEC Golfer of the Year in 2016.

Professional career
In late 2017, Torres turned professional after the LPGA Final Qualifying Tournament. She won a three-hole aggregate playoff at to secure the 20th qualifying spot to earn a LPGA Tour card for the 2018 season, becoming the first player from Puerto Rico to earn full membership on the LPGA Tour.

On the 2018 LPGA Tour, she made 14 cuts in 24 events. She recorded two top-10 results and finished sixth in the Rookie of the Year ranking. In 2019, she recorded a career best finish of T4 at the Indy Women in Tech Championship.

Torres qualified for the Tokyo Summer Olympics in 2021.

Amateur wins
2012 Junior at Innisbrook, Caribbean Junior Championship, Caribbean Amateur Championship, Junior Orange Bowl International
2013 PRGA Junior Island Championship
2014 Caribbean Amateur Championship
2015 The Alamo Invitational
2016 SEC Championship 
2017 SunTrust Gator Invite, Briar's Creek Invitational, Caribbean Amateur Championship

Source:

Professional wins

Epson Tour wins
2022 Guardian Championship

Results in LPGA majors
Results not in chronological order.

CUT = missed the half-way cut
NT = no tournament
T = tied

Team appearances
Amateur
Espirito Santo Trophy (representing Puerto Rico): 2014, 2016
Pan American Games (representing Puerto Rico): 2015

References

External links

Puerto Rican female golfers
Olympic golfers of Puerto Rico
Golfers at the 2020 Summer Olympics
Golfers at the 2015 Pan American Games
Florida Gators women's golfers
People from Trujillo Alto, Puerto Rico
1994 births
Living people